Tangra is a region in East Kolkata that traditionally housed many tanneries owned by people of Hakka Chinese origin.

Overview
"47 South Tangra Road", may be the most confusing postal address, as it used to cover the whole of Chinatown Tangra with over 350 tanneries. Most of the standing structures have been built, over many years, by the industrious Hakka Chinese, upon marshy and reclaimed low-lying land. Over the past several decades, it has served as the location of Calcutta's Chinatown. This is not a coincidence; the Hakka Chinese of Calcutta have gradually turned this part of the Kolkata into an important destination for sourcing finished and semi-finished leather. The Hakka Chinese specialized in the manufacture of leather and turned it into one of the major industries of West Bengal, providing employment to tens of thousands of local inhabitants. In addition to the huge volume of exports to the developing and developed countries, finished leather is supplied to the major shoe and leather goods manufacturers all over the country. Many made-to-order shoe shops in Kolkata are also run by entrepreneurs from this community.

Amidst the Chinese establishments and restaurants, there is a very old and auspicious 'Kali Mondir'. The temple is situated near Kim Fa restaurant and Relax Foreign Liquor Shop. This temple is visited by both Chinese and Hindu devotees. One needs to be there to experience the spectacle of two cultures harmoniously doing business generation after generation.

Food from Tangra is a distinct variety of traditional Hakka Chinese cuisine adapted to Indian ingredients and the Bengali palate. This has spread to the rest of India, along with the recipes earlier unique to Tangra.  Tangra is now the most popular destination for Chinese food. Chinese food sold in Tangra restaurants are now known all over the world as "Hakka Style" Chinese food.

Kolkata Chinatown is changing rapidly. The population is no longer renewed by waves of migration and many traditional professions such as dentistry, laundry and tannery are no longer the preserve of the Chinese. The West Bengal government, under direction from the Supreme Court, recently moved all tanneries to Bantala, a suburb in the east of Kolkata. However, Tangra has been an integral part of the culture of the Chinese community in India.

The success of "Hakka style" Chinese food in the rest of India encouraged a migration of many Chinese families to other cities as the economic fortunes of Tangra decayed. Many landmark Chinese eateries, including Nanking, Waldorf, Peiping and Fat Mama have closed or changed hands and fortunes. The once prosperous Calcutta Chinese community is now clearly in decline. However, a boom in Tangra's unique Indian-Chinese food is attracting a lot of attention these days and the cuisine will probably live on in Kolkata and in the global Indian Diaspora.

The Cha Project, is designed to preserve Tiretti Bazaar and develop Tangra.

History
The East India Company obtained from the Mughal emperor Farrukhsiyar, in 1717, the right to rent from 38 villages surrounding their settlement. Of these 5 lay across the Hooghly in what is now Howrah district. The remaining 33 villages were on the Calcutta side. After the fall of Siraj-ud-daulah, the last independent Nawab of Bengal, it purchased these villages in 1758 from Mir Jafar and reorganised them. These villages were known en-bloc as Dihi Panchannagram and Tangra was one of them. It was considered to be a suburb beyond the limits of the Maratha Ditch.

In the eastern fringes of Kolkata, the neighbourhoods such as Tangra, Tiljala, Topsia and Dhapa, were populated largely with people who migrated from poverty-ridden and caste-ridden villages, in Bihar and Uttar Pradesh. They came with dreams of a better life but landed in the slums with open drains, pigsties, factory chimneys and pungent chemicals. They found work in the tanneries and factories, and also engaged in menial work. A big proportion of them were Chamars, but there also were Doms, Dosads, Mehtars and Kahars. They were all Harijans and they formed a majority. They escaped from the petty persecution they faced in their villages but were far removed from the mainstream of urban life and culture.  They have been here, living in depressing conditions, for more than a century.

Geography

Police district
Tangra police station is in the Eastern Suburban division of Kolkata Police. It is located at 15, Gobinda Chandra Khatik Road, Kolkata-700015.

Ultadanga Women police station covers all police districts under the jurisdiction of the Eastern Suburban division i.e. Beliaghata, Entally, Manicktolla, Narkeldanga, Ultadanga, Tangra and Phoolbagan.

Transport

Bus

Private Bus
 24 Topsia - Bandhaghat
 24A Topsia - Bandhaghat
 213 Ghatakpukur - Babughat
 SD24 Sonakhali, Basanti - Alipore Zoo

Mini Bus
 S166 Tangra - Howrah Station

Train
Park Circus railway station on Sealdah South lines is the nearest railway station.

See also
Chinese influences on Bengali cuisine
Hakka Chinese
Hakka cuisine
Hakka people
Indian Chinese cuisine
Tiretta Bazaar

References

External links
 

Chinese-Indian culture
Ethnic enclaves in India
Indian leather industry
Neighbourhoods in Kolkata
Restaurant districts and streets in India
Tanning (leather)